The 1995 European Figure Skating Championships was a senior-level international competition held in Dortmund, Germany. Elite skaters from European ISU member nations competed in the disciplines of men's singles, ladies' singles, pair skating, and ice dancing.

Competition notes
Surya Bonaly won her fifth consecutive European title, having executed seven triple jumps, including a rare triple lutz, triple toe loop combination.

Susanna Rahkamo / Petri Kokko were the first Finns to win the European Championships, with the next title won by Laura Lepistö in ladies' singles in 2009.

17-year-old Ilia Kulik placed first in the short program and held off reigning Olympic champion Alexei Urmanov to finish first overall.

Results

Men

Ladies

Pairs

Ice dancing

References

External links
 https://web.archive.org/web/20081026042005/http://www.eskatefans.com/skatabase/euromen1990.html

European Figure Skating Championships, 1995
European Figure Skating Championships, 1995
European Figure Skating Championships
European 1995
European Figure Skating Championships, 1995
January 1995 sports events in Europe
20th century in Dortmund
1990s in North Rhine-Westphalia